Carex curvicollis is a tussock-forming species of perennial sedge in the family Cyperaceae. It is native to parts of Japan.

The species was first formally described by the botanists Adrien René Franchet and Ludovic Savatier in 1879 as a part of the work Enumeratio Plantarum in Japonia Sponte Crescentium.

See also
List of Carex species

References

curvicollis
Taxa named by Adrien René Franchet
Taxa named by Ludovic Savatier
Plants described in 1878
Flora of Japan